Faridpur Sadar Upazila is an upazila (sub-district) of Faridpur District in the Division of Dhaka, Bangladesh. It contains Faridpur Town near the banks of the Padma River.

One of 18 registered red-light districts in Bangladesh is located in Faridpur. About 800 women and girls live and work there.

Geography
It has 60454 households and total area 407.02 km2.

Demographics
At the 1991 Bangladesh census, Faridpur Sadar had a population of 335,386, of whom 176,469 were aged 18 or older. Males constituted 51.91% of the population, and females 48.09%. Faridpur Sadar had an average literacy rate of 34.2% (7+ years), against the national average of 32.4%.

Administration
Faridpur Sadar Upazila is divided into Faridpur Municipality and 11 union parishads: Aliabad, Ambikapur, Char Madhabdia, Decreer Char, Greda, Ishan Gopalpur, Kaijuri, Kanaipur, Krishnanagar, Maj Char, and Uttar Channel. The union parishads are subdivided into 157 mauzas and 342 villages.

Faridpur Municipality is subdivided into 9 wards and 41 mahallas.

Elected chairmen of Faridpur Upazila Council 

 Imran Hossain Chowdhury (Jatiya Party) [1984–1989]
 Advocate Alhajj Md. Shamsul Haque (Bhola Master) (Awami League) 
 Khondker Mohtesham Hossain Babor (Awami League) [Acting Upazila chairman, Faridpur Sadar Upazila]

Notable residents
 Abdus Salam Khan, Minister of Public Works and Communication (1955–1956) in the East Pakistan provincial cabinet, was born in Faridpur.

See also
Upazilas of Bangladesh
Districts of Bangladesh
Divisions of Bangladesh

References

Faridpur District
Upazilas of Faridpur District
Red-light districts in Bangladesh